Gabriel Rockhill (born 1972) is a French-American philosopher, writer, cultural critic, and activist. He is Professor of Philosophy at Villanova University, Director of the Critical Theory Workshop/Atelier de Théorie Critique, and former Directeur de programme at the Collège International de Philosophie.

Best known for his innovative scholarly work in the fields of history, aesthetics and politics, he is also a regular contributor to public intellectual debate, and his writings have circulated widely in venues such as CounterPunch, Black Agenda Report, the New York Times, Libération and the Los Angeles Review of Books.

Early Life and Education
As an undergraduate Rockhill attended Grinnell College in Iowa, graduating in 1995. He then moved to Paris to study philosophy, where he studied with many leading French intellectuals. He earned a master's degree under the direction of Jacques Derrida and Luce Irigaray from the School for Advanced Studies in the Social Sciences, and a Ph.D. under the direction of Alain Badiou from Paris 8 University, where Étienne Balibar led the committee for the dissertations evaluation. Rockhill also holds a Ph.D. in philosophy from Emory University.

Work

Academic Philosophy 
Rockhill has advanced a new model for thinking the historical relationship between art and politics. Rather than understanding them as two spheres separated by an insurmountable divide or linked by a privileged bridge, he demonstrates through historical and materialist analysis that they are not fixed entities with a singular relation, but rather social practices and "concepts in struggle." In books like Radical History & the Politics of Art (Columbia University Press, 2014) and Interventions in Contemporary Thought: History, Politics, Aesthetics (Edinburgh University Press, 2016), he proposes a significant departure from extant philosophical debates on what is commonly called "art" and "politics" in the name of a radically historicist analysis of the political dimensions inherent in the modes of production, circulation and reception of aesthetic practices. Engaging with a diverse array of intellectual, artistic, and political traditions, his work carefully maps interactions between different aspects of aesthetic and political practices as they intertwine and sometimes merge in specific fields of struggle.

In his earlier work, Logique de l'histoire: pour une analytique des pratiques philosophiques (Éditions Hermann, 2010), he developed an alternative logic of history and historical change, which emphasizes the geographic and social dimensions of history, as well as a novel account of social practices and a multidimensional theory of agency. His most recent book, Contre-histoire du temps présent: interrogations intempestives sur la mondialisation, la technologie, la démocratie (CNRS Éditions, 2017; published in English as Counter-History of the Present: Untimely Interrogations into Globalization, Technology, Democracy, Duke University Press, 2017) expands this work to a critical analysis of the dominant image of the present moment, thereby dismantling what he refers to as the "historical and political imaginary of the contemporary conjuncture."

Critical Theory Workshop 
Since 2008, Rockhill has directed the Critical Theory Workshop/Atelier de Théorie Critique in Paris. Originally conceived as a study abroad program for Villanova University, it currently operates as an independent nonprofit that hosts an annual Summer School at the School for Advanced Studies in the Social Sciences.

Critical Theory and the Cold War 
In addition to his scholarly publications, Rockhill has written a number of essays of political critiques that tie the United States' Central Intelligence Agency and other Western capitalist nation-states' security apparatus of having influenced the anti-communist politics of Western intellectual thought, including the Frankfurt School, Michel Foucault, and Slavoj Žižek. These online articles for prominent left literary publications have been subject to widespread debate and have been translated into multiple languages.

Selected Bibliography

Books

Sole-Authored Books 
La CIA et les intellectuels: Une histoire souterraine des idées. De l'école de Francfort aux "nouveaux philosophes" (La fabrique éditions, forthcoming).
Contre-histoire du temps présent: interrogations intempestives sur la mondialisation, la technologie, la démocratie (CNRS Éditions, 2017), published in English as Counter-History of the Present: Untimely Interrogations into Globalization, Technology, Democracy (Duke University Press, 2017).
 Interventions in Contemporary Thought: History, Politics, Aesthetics  (Edinburgh University Press, 2016).
 Radical History & the Politics of Art (New York: Columbia University Press, Series "New Directions in Critical Theory," 2014), 288 pp. . (pb.)
 Logique de l’histoire: Pour une analytique des pratiques philosophiques  (Paris: Editions Hermann, series "Hermann Philosophie," 2010), 534 pp. . (pb.)

Edited Books
 With Alfredo Gomez-Muller, in collaboration with Seyla Benhabib, Nancy Fraser, Judith Butler, Immanuel Wallerstein, Cornel West, Will Kymlicka, Michael Sandel and Axel Honneth: Politics of Culture and the Spirit of Critique: Dialogues (New York: Columbia University Press, Series "New Directions in Critical Theory," 2011), 240 pp. . (pb.)
 French edition (slightly different): Critique et subversion dans la pensée contemporaine américaine: Dialogues (Paris: Editions du Félin, 2010).
 Spanish edition (slightly different): La teoría crítica en Norteamérica: Política, ética y actualidad (Medellín: La Carreta Editores, 2008).
 With Pierre-Antoine Chardel: Technologies de contrôle dans la mondialisation: enjeux politiques, éthiques et esthétiques (Paris: Editions Kimé, 2009), 207 pp. . (pb.)
 With Philip Watts: Jacques Rancière: History, Politics, Aesthetics (Durham, North Carolina: Duke University Press, 2009), 368 pp. . (pb.)

Edited Translations 
 With John V. Garner: Cornelius Castoriadis. Postscript on Insignificance: Dialogues with Cornelius Castoriadis (London: Continuum Books, 2011).
 Jacques Rancière. The Politics of Aesthetics  (London: Continuum Books, 2004).

Articles

Journal Articles 

 "Foucault, Genealogy, Counter-History." Theory & Event, vol. 23 no. 1, 2020, p. 85-119. Project MUSE muse.jhu.edu/article/747096.

Public Essays 

 "Capitalism’s Court Jester: Slavoj Žižek," CounterPunch, January 3, 2023.
 "The CIA & The Frankfurt School's Anti-Communism,"The Philosophical Salon, June 27, 2022,
 "Foucault, Anti-Communism & the Global Theory Industry: A Reply to Critics," The Philosophical Salon, February 1, 2021.
 "Foucault: The Faux Radical,"The Philosophical Salon, October 12, 2020.
 Who’s Afraid of Direct Action on Campus? Mobilizing Pedagogy Against the Powerful, Truthout, August 23, 2017.
 "The CIA Reads French Theory: On the Intellectual Labor of Dismantling the Cultural Left," The Philosophical Salon, February 28, 2017.
 "Unraveling Love Stories," The New York Times, February 13, 2017.
 "Why We Never Die," The New York Times, August 29, 2016.

References

External links

 Website

Living people
Grinnell College alumni
Paris 8 University Vincennes-Saint-Denis alumni
Emory University alumni
Villanova University faculty
Continental philosophers
French–English translators
1972 births